Nanchong Gaoping Airport  is the airport serving the city of Nanchong in Sichuan province, China.

Airlines and destinations

See also
List of airports in China

References

Airports in Sichuan
Buildings and structures in Nanchong